Queen's School, Ibadan is an all-girls secondary school located in Ibadan, the capital of Oyo State, South-Western Nigeria.

History
Queen's School, Ibadan was founded on 16th February,1952 as Queen's School, Ede in honor of the Coronation of Queen Elizabeth II to the throne. With a few selected pioneering students from Queen's College, Lagos, school activities started with four teachers and the principal.

Past principals
Miss Hobson — 1952–1954
Mrs. I. Dickinson — 1957–1958
Mrs. R.M. Dunn — 1963–1967
Mrs. C.F. Oredugba — 1958–1962, 1968-1970
Late Mrs. T.A.O. Lawore — 1970–1972
Mrs. C.O. Ogunbiyi — 1975–1976
Mrs. O.F. Ifaturoti — 1976–1977
Mrs. Oyinkan Ayoola — 1972–1975, 1980–1984
Mrs. T. Fajola — 1978–1980, 1990–1991
Mrs. E.O. Falobi — 1984–1987
Mrs. B.M. Ajayi — 1987–1989
Mrs. A.T. Olofin — 1992–1995
Mrs. Remi Lasekan-Osunsanya — 1991–1992, 1995–1997
Mrs. A.T. Olofin — 1997–2004
Mrs. Ajani — 2004
Mrs Fatoki
Mrs Fatoba- 2015-2019
Mrs B.T.Oyintiloye- 2020-present

Notable alumni
Nike Akande
Grace Oladunni Taylor
Ameyo Adadevoh
Toyin Sanni, Nigerian CEO

Notable faculty
Grace Alele-Williams

References

Educational institutions established in 1952
Schools in Ibadan
1952 establishments in Nigeria
Girls' schools in Nigeria